Aladji Mansour Ba (born 11 November 1989) is a Senegalese footballer who plays as a midfielder, most recently for Azerbaijan Premier League club Kapaz PFK. Previously, Ba played for ASC Linguère and ASC Diaraf in Senegal.

Career

Club
On 27 October 2017, Ba signed for Azerbaijan Premier League side Kapaz PFK until the end of the 2017–18 season. On 21 December 2017, Kapaz announced that they had parted ways with Ba.

Career statistics

Club

References

External links
 

1989 births
Living people
Association football midfielders
Senegalese footballers
Expatriate footballers in Morocco
Expatriate footballers in Azerbaijan
Botola players
Azerbaijan Premier League players
KAC Kénitra players
Kapaz PFK players
Shanghai Shenxin F.C. players
China League One players
Expatriate footballers in China